Bear Mountain is a peak of the southern Taconic Mountains in  Salisbury, Connecticut. At 2316 feet (note, per references 1 and 3, there is disagreement about the precise elevation), Bear Mountain is the highest mountain that lies wholly within  Connecticut. However, it is not the state highpoint: in the 1940s, the United States Geological Survey determined that the highest elevation in the state, at 2380 feet, was actually on the nearby Connecticut-Massachusetts border, on the southern slope of Massachusetts’ Mount Frissell. There is a stone monument on the Bear Mountain summit. The Appalachian Trail crosses the mountain in a generally north-south direction.

History

See also

Outline of Connecticut
Index of Connecticut-related articles

References

Sources

External links
 
 
 

Salisbury, Connecticut
Mountains of Connecticut
Mountains on the Appalachian Trail
Protected areas of Litchfield County, Connecticut
Taconic Mountains
Landforms of Litchfield County, Connecticut
Nature reserves in Connecticut